The 2018–19 season was Feyenoord's 111th season of play, the club's 63rd season in the Eredivisie and its 97th consecutive season in the top flight of Dutch football. It was the fourth season with manager Giovanni van Bronckhorst. Feyenoord entered the 2018–19 KNVB Cup in the first round and the 2018–19 UEFA Europa League in the third preliminary round.

Competitions

Overview 
{|class="wikitable" style="text-align:left"
|-
!rowspan=2 style="width:140px;"|Competition
!colspan=8|Record
|-
!style="width:30px;"|
!style="width:30px;"|
!style="width:30px;"|
!style="width:30px;"|
!style="width:30px;"|
!style="width:30px;"|
!style="width:30px;"|
!style="width:50px;"|
|-
|Eredivisie

|-
|KNVB Cup

|-
|Johan Cruyff Shield

|-
|Europa League

|-
!Total

Eredivisie

League table

Results by matchday

Matches 
These are the matches scheduled for Feyenoord in the 2018-2019 Eredivisie season.

KNVB Cup

Johan Cruyff Shield

Europa League

Qualifying phase 

Third qualifying round

Trenčín won 5–1 on aggregate.

Player details

Appearances (Apps.) numbers are for appearances in competitive games only including sub appearances
Red card numbers denote:   Numbers in parentheses represent red cards overturned for wrongful dismissal.

Overturned Red Cards:
Robin van Persie

Transfers

Summer window

In:

 
 (on loan) 
 (return from loan) 
 (return from loan)

 (return from loan)
 (return from loan)

Out:

 (return from loan)
 
 
 (on loan)

Winter window

In:

 (on loan) 

Out:

 (on loan) 
 (on loan) 
 
 (on loan) 
 (on loan) 
 (on loan)

Notes

References

Feyenoord seasons
Feyenoord
Feyenoord